The Bava Beccaris massacre, named after the Italian General Fiorenzo Bava Beccaris, was the repression of widespread food riots in Milan, Italy, on 6–10 May 1898. In Italy the suppression of these demonstrations is also known as Fatti di Maggio (Events of May) or I moti di Milano del 1898 (the Milan riots of 1898). At least 80 demonstrators were killed, as well as two soldiers, and 450 wounded, according to government sources.

The overreaction of the military led to the demise of Antonio Di Rudinì and his government in July 1898 and created a constitutional crisis, strengthening the opposition. The events of May marked a height of popular discontent with government, the military and the monarchy.

Background
In 1897, the wheat harvest in Italy was substantially lower than the years before; it fell from on average 3.5 million tons in 1891–95 to 2.4 million tons that year. Moreover, import of American grain was more expensive due to the Spanish–American War in 1898. Wheat prices in Milan increased from 225 lire a tonne to 330 lire a tonne in April 1898.

In order to try to diminish the rising prices the government of Di Rudinì was urged to abolish the duty on imported wheat. In January 1898 the tariff was lowered from 75 lire a tonne to 50 lire, but this was generally considered to be too little and too late. Street demonstrations demanding "bread and work" began in the South of Italy, which already had seen widespread revolts by the Fasci Siciliani in 1893–94. In towns like Bari and Naples rioting could be suppressed, while Florence was controlled by demonstrators for a whole day. The situation escalated when demonstrators were shot by nervous policemen, and rioting increased.

The riots

On 5 May 1898 workers organized a strike against the rise of food prices. The first blood was shed that day at Pavia, when the son of Giuseppe Mussi, a deputy from Milan, was killed by the police in an attempt to control the crowd. The next day, 6 May, workers of the Pirelli factory went on strike in the morning and leaflets denouncing the events of the previous day were distributed. Riots broke out and two were shot and killed. Riots also broke out in Florence and Livorno.

Di Rudinì's government declared a state of siege in Lombardy and the city. General Fiorenzo Bava Beccaris, a veteran of the wars of independence that had unified Italy was ordered to Milan. Infantry, cavalry and artillery were brought into the city, as well as railway troops because railway workers had gone on strike as well. The troops were mainly conscripts from rural and alpine areas, considered to be more reliable in a time of civil unrest than those from urban districts. With reserves, Bava Beccaris had 45,000 men at his disposal.

On 7 May, 60,000 people went on strike, moving from the working-class neighborhoods in the outskirts of the city towards the city center of Milan. Bava Beccaris deployed his forces in the Piazza del Duomo, Milan's central square, determined to stop the strikers and force them back to the city outskirts and regain control over the central railway station. The troops met with fierce resistance while trying to remove the barricades that had been erected, and were bombarded with stones and tiles from the rooftops. Some of the demonstrators had acquired rifles from the workshops of arms manufacturers.

General Bava Beccaris ordered his troops to fire on demonstrators and used the artillery as well. The streets were cleared. On 9 May 1898 the troops used artillery to breach the walls of a monastery outside Porta Monforte, but they found inside only a group of beggars who were there to receive assistance from the friars. According to the government, 80 demonstrators and other civilians were killed, as well as two soldiers. A total of 450 persons were wounded. The opposition claimed 400 dead and more than 2,000 injured people. According to The New York Times 300 people were killed and 1,000 wounded.

Backlash
Military tribunals were set up, over some of which Bava Beccaris personally presided, that sentenced about 1,500 people to prison. The conduct of the authorities was deemed by analysts to be "a travesty of justice and a mockery of legal procedure." Newspapers considered to be in opposition to the government were suppressed, and several Catholic and Socialist organizations were dissolved.

Filippo Turati, one of the founders of the Socialist Party of Italy (PSI) in 1892, was arrested, accused of inspiring the riots, and given a 12-year prison sentence. In fact, he had been trying to calm down the situation with a pamphlet calling on the demonstrators to be "calm and patient" and arguing that the "days for street fighting are past." He was freed a year later, in 1899, after a wave of discontent in the country. The experience convinced him that the way ahead was the parliamentary route and he renounced violent action.

Aftermath

King Umberto I praised general Bava Beccaris and awarded him the medal of the Great Cross of the Order of Savoy (Grande Ufficiale dell'Ordine Militare di Savoia) a month later, "to reward the great service you rendered to our institutions and to civilization, and to attest to my affection and the gratitude of myself and the country". On 29 July 1900, the king was assassinated in Monza by the anarchist Gaetano Bresci, who claimed he had come directly from the United States to avenge the victims of the repression, and the insult of the decoration awarded to Bava Beccaris.

The overreaction of the military led to the demise of Di Rudini and his government in May 1898 and created a constitutional crisis, strengthening the opposition. The massacre marked a height of popular discontent with government, the military and the monarchy.

The new Prime Minister Luigi Pelloux, who in May 1898 had restored public order in Bari without recourse to martial law, introduced a new Public Safety Bill to reform police laws, taken over by him from the Rudinì cabinet. The law made strikes by state employees illegal; gave the executive wider powers to ban public meetings and dissolve subversive organizations; revived the penalties of banishment and preventive arrest for political offenses; and tightened control of the press by making authors responsible for their articles and declaring incitement to violence a crime.

The new coercive law was fiercely obstructed by the Socialist Party, which, with the Left and Extreme Left, succeeded in forcing General Pelloux to dissolve the Chamber in May 1900, after he had promulgated the new law by royal decree. Even members of his conservative constituency accused him of acting unconstitutionally and Pelloux had to resign office after the general election in June.

Depictions in art
The artist Quinto Cenni prepared a series of 34 eyewitness paintings showing various scenes of the disturbances in the city and of the actions taken to suppress them. These generally favored the government version of events, showing soldiers behaving with restraint under provocation and being welcomed by ordinary citizens.

See also
 Kingdom of Italy
 List of massacres in Italy

References

Further reading
 Clark, Martin (1984/2014). Modern Italy, 1871 to the Present, New York: Routledge, 
 Sarti, Roland (2004). Italy: A reference Guide from the Renaissance to the Present, New York: Facts on File Inc., 
 Seton-Watson, Christopher (1967). Italy from Liberalism to Fascism, 1870–1925, New York: Taylor & Francis, 
 Stephenson, Charles (2014). A Box of Sand: The Italo-Ottoman War 1911–1912, Tycehurst: Tattered Flag,

External links
  I moti del pane - maggio 1898

History of Milan
1898 in Italy
1898 riots
Mass murder in 1898
Massacres in 1898
Massacres in Italy
Labor disputes in Italy
Riots and civil disorder in Italy
Economic history of Italy
Protests in Italy
19th century in Milan
May 1898 events
Massacres committed by Italy
1898 murders in Italy